Parliamentary elections were held in Greece on 7 February 1899. Although Charilaos Trikoupis died in 1896, his supporters emerged as the largest bloc in Parliament, with 110 of the 235 seats, Georgios Theotokis, his successor as a leader of the New Party became Prime Minister after the election.

Results

References

Greece
Parliamentary elections in Greece
1899 in Greece
Greece
1890s in Greek politics